Paul Davidson (born in Smithtown, New York in 1971) is an American author who is best known for his Words for My Enjoyment blog and his 2006 book The Lost Blogs.

It was after moving to Los Angeles, California in 1995 and working in film production at a variety of film companies like New Line Cinema and the Jim Henson Company that he began writing. Davidson is a contributor to National Public Radio's All Things Considered, Wired Magazine, Mental Floss Magazine and The Los Angeles Times.

Books

Consumer Joe
On September 9, 2003 he released his book Consumer Joe: Harassing Corporate America, One Letter at a Time.  As of August 2005 the book was already entering its fourth printing and in 2007 remained on Amazon's top 200,000 book seller list.

The Lost Blogs
In July 2005, Davidson sold his second humor book, The Lost Blogs to Time Warner. The fictional humor book, which features weblogs "as written" by history's most famous figures, was published in 2006.

The Small Stuff

On April 12, 2022, he released his book, The Small Stuff, published by Hadleigh House Publishing. ISBN 978-1735773872

Film & Television
Paul Davidson has worked as a supervising line producer for an episode of The Princes of Malibu.  He has also been on film crews in various capacities.  He is currently working on the sci-fi comedy Grounded for Walt Disney Pictures.

Outing Mr. Six
In February 2006, Davidson revealed the true identity of the Six Flags Dancing Guy Mr. Six on his blog as Queer Eye for the Straight Girl's Danny Teeson. The reveal was also confirmed in The New York Post and In Style Magazine.

References

External links
Official site

1971 births
Living people
American male bloggers
American bloggers
American male writers